G9, G.IX, G09 or G-9 has several uses including:

 Group of Nine, a group of nine European states
 G9 (consortium), a group of nine Australian internet providers
 G9 (album), the debut album of Gloc-9v
 G9, a standard bipin lightbulb socket
 G9, shorthand for FRG9, Fos Revolisyone G9 an Fanmi e Alye, or Revolutionary Forces of the G9 Family and Allies, a coalition of armed organizations in Haiti.
 G9 star, a subclass of G-class stars
 G9 Family and Allies, an alliance of Haitian gangs led by Jimmy Cherizier
 Canon PowerShot G9, a digital camera
 County Route G9 (California)
 Gotha G.IX, a 1918 German bomber aircraft 
 HMS G9, a British submarine
 HMS Quilliam (G09), a 1941 British Royal Navy Q class destroyer
and also :
 G9 is the IATA airline designator for Air Arabia 
 Gaia Online, donation item 
   
 Group 9 elements of the periodic table
 Nachtjagdgeschwader 1, from its historic Geschwaderkennung code with the Luftwaffe in World War II